Ilir Krasniqi (born 2 April 2000) is a professional footballer who plays as a defensive midfielder for Llapi in Football Superleague of Kosovo. Born in Germany, he represents the Kosovo national team at international level.

Club career
On 23 December 2020, Krasniqi signed a five-year contract with Football Superleague of Kosovo club Llapi, and received squad number 21.

International career
From 2018, until 2022, Krasniqi is part of Kosovo at youth international level, respectively part of the U19 and U21 teams and he with these teams played seven matches. On 30 May 2022, he received a call-up from the senior team for training session before the 2022–23 UEFA Nations League matches against Cyprus, Greece and Northern Ireland, but did not make the final squad.

On 16 September 2022, Krasniqi received again a call-up from Kosovo for the 2022–23 UEFA Nations League matches against Northern Ireland and Cyprus. His debut with Kosovo came eleven days after call-up in a 2022–23 UEFA Nations League match against Cyprus after coming on as a substitute at 89th minute in place of Florent Hadergjonaj.

References

External links

2000 births
Living people
People from Bocholt, Germany
Kosovan footballers
Kosovo international footballers
Kosovo under-21 international footballers
Kosovo youth international footballers
German footballers
German people of Kosovan descent
Association football midfielders
Football Superleague of Kosovo players
KF KEK players
KF Llapi players